Jalan Nyalas, (Malacca state route M15 or Negeri Sembilan state route N15) is a major road in Malacca and Negeri Sembilan state, Malaysia.

List of junctions (south–north)

Roads in Malacca
Roads in Negeri Sembilan